Nor Sarah binti Adi (born 20 August 2000) is a Malaysian athlete. She won gold medal in pole vault event in 2021 Southeast Asian Games and won broze medal in  relay event.

References

External links

2000 births
Living people
People from Pahang
Malaysian people of Malay descent
Female pole vaulters
Malaysian female sprinters
Southeast Asian Games medalists in athletics
Southeast Asian Games gold medalists for Malaysia
Southeast Asian Games bronze medalists for Malaysia
Competitors at the 2021 Southeast Asian Games
Islamic Solidarity Games medalists in athletics